Manhattan on the Rocks is a various artists compilation album released in 1992 by Pow Wow Records, consisting of music by bands based in New York. AllMusic awarded the compilation three out of five possible stars.

Track listing

Personnel
Adapted from the Manhattan on the Rocks liner notes.

 Chris Gehringer – mastering
 Kaz – illustrations
 Carolyn Quan – design

Release history

References

External links 
 

1992 compilation albums
Alternative rock compilation albums
Industrial rock compilation albums
Noise rock compilation albums